Scremby is a village in the civil parish of Ashby with Scremby, in the East Lindsey district of  Lincolnshire, England.

Scremby's red-brick church was built in 1733, and is dedicated to Saint Peter and Saint Paul. It is a Grade II* listed building.

Scremby Hall was home to the Brackenbury family, although the last resident family member left to live in Wimbledon, Surrey in 1937. It was demolished in the 1970s.

Scremby Manor was a 16th-century building with alterations in the 18th, 19th and 20th centuries. It is Grade II listed.

Scremby's C of E school – known as Scremby and Ashby C of E School from 1903 to 1935 – closed in 1960.

Local archaeology 
The deserted medieval village (DMV) of Laysingthorpe (or Laisintorp), was probably in or near Scremby.

Between 2017 and 2019, archaeological excavations near Scremby revealed a 5th-6th century AD high status Anglo-Saxon cemetery, with a range of grave goods that included jewellery, combs, shields and other weapons, in total 49 graves containing the remains of men and women were recovered.
The site was initially discovered by a local detectorist; subsequent excavations were carried out by Dr Hugh Willmott from the University of Sheffield Archaeology Department, together with members of the Royal Air Force, and regional and international volunteers.

References

External links

Villages in Lincolnshire
East Lindsey District